Infame accusa is a 1953 Italian melodrama film. It represents the directorial debut by Giuseppe Vari.

Plot

Cast
 Mirella Uberti	as	Gina
 Piero Lulli	as Marco
 Folco Lulli	as	Giovannino
 Marisa Merlini	as	Lover of Giovannino
 Arnoldo Foà	as	Don Antonio
 Vittorio Duse

References

External links
 

1953 films
1950s Italian-language films
Films directed by Giuseppe Vari
1952 directorial debut films
Italian black-and-white films
Italian drama films
1953 drama films
Melodrama films
1950s Italian films